In the 1869 Iowa State Senate elections, Iowa voters elected state senators to serve in the thirteenth Iowa General Assembly. Following the expansion of the Iowa Senate from 49 to 50 seats in 1869, elections were held for 21 of the state senate's 50 seats. State senators serve four-year terms in the Iowa State Senate.

The general election took place on October 12, 1869.

Following the previous election in 1867, Republicans had control of the Iowa Senate with 40 seats to Democrats' eight seats and a lone member from the People's Party. However, three changes occurred during the twelfth general assembly. In the tenth district, Republican Senator Charles Leopold Matthies died on October 16, 1868, causing a vacancy in his seat. In the eighteenth district, Republican Senator John R. Needham died on July 9, 1868, causing a vacancy in his seat. In the twenty-fourth district, Republican Senator William Penn Wolf resigned on March 3, 1869, causing a vacancy in his seat. All three seats were left vacant until the next election. Therefore, by election day in 1869, the Republicans held 37 seats, the Democrats held 8 seats, there was a lone People's Party member, and three seats were vacant (all the vacancies had been held by Republicans).

To claim control of the chamber from Republicans, the Democrats needed to net 18 Senate seats.

Republicans maintained control of the Iowa State Senate following the election with the balance of power shifting to Republicans holding 43 seats and Democrats having seven seats (a net gain of 6 seats for Republicans).

Summary of Results 
 Note: The holdover Senators not up for re-election are not listed on this table.

Source:

Detailed Results
NOTE: The Iowa General Assembly does not provide detailed vote totals for Iowa State Senate elections in 1869.

See also
 Elections in Iowa

External links
District boundaries were redrawn before the 1869 general election for the Iowa Senate:
Iowa Senate Districts 1868-1869 map
Iowa Senate Districts 1870-1871 map

References

Iowa Senate
Iowa
Iowa Senate elections